This is a list of the youngest mayors in India. This list is inclusive of individuals nearest to the age of majority at the time of their election; usually under the age of 30.

Youngest mayors

References 

Mayors by city in India
Lists of mayors of places in India
Lists of the youngest people